Inverigo is a comune (municipality) in the Province of Como in the Italian region Lombardy, located about  north of Milan and about  southeast of Como. As of 31 December 2004, it had a population of 8,209 and an area of 10.0 km².

The municipality of Inverigo contains the frazioni (subdivisions, mainly villages and hamlets) Cremnago, Villa Romanò, and Romanò.

Inverigo borders the following municipalities: Alzate Brianza, Arosio, Brenna, Briosco, Carugo, Giussano, Lambrugo, Lurago d'Erba, Nibionno, Veduggio con Colzano.

Outside the town is the eclectic structure of Villa La Rotonda.

Demographic evolution

References

Cities and towns in Lombardy